Richard Kenneth Mast (born March 4, 1957) is a former NASCAR driver. He competed in both the Winston Cup and Busch Series before retiring in 2002. He holds a business administration degree from Blue Ridge Community College.

Early and Busch career
Mast grew up in racing as his father and uncle were both race team owners. He began racing at age 16 at Natural Bridge Speedway and Eastside Speedway, after he traded an Angus for his first car. After racing at the local track level for the decade, Mast began running the Busch Series in 1982, and had four top-ten finishes in eleven starts in his No. 22. Mast's first full-time season came in 1985, where he had fifteen top-ten finishes and finished seventh in the season points. Two years later, he won his first NASCAR race, at the Grand National 200, then followed it up with another win the next week. He finished 11th in points that year. He improved to eighth position in 1988 the same year he made his Winston Cup debut for Buddy Baker at the Busch 500, finishing 28th at that race. Mast won five Busch races while running full-time the next two years, before focusing his efforts on the Cup Series.

Cup career
Mast made his Cup debut in a two-race schedule for Baker-Schiff Racing as an injury replacement for Buddy Baker.

Car No. 1

Mast ran 13 races for Mach 1 Racing in 1989, finishing sixth at the Daytona 500 in an unsponsored car, which Mast called his proudest achievement in racing. He still believes he would have won had his team been willing to gamble on fuel mileage.  Mast ran selected races in 1990 for D.K. Ulrich before finishing the year with Travis Carter Motorsports. In 1991, Mast signed to drive the No. 1 Skoal Classic-sponsored Oldsmobile for Richard Jackson's Precision Products Racing. He started out the season by leading 14 laps in the Daytona 500 and finished fourth. He had three Top 10's and finished 21st in points. That year, the Talladega Superspeedway produced a couple of highlights for Mast. In the Winston 500, he pushed a fuel-deficient Harry Gant (driving for Leo Jackson, Richard's brother) during the final lap of the race, helping Gant win (Mast was one lap down in 10th). This action is prohibited after the white flag by NASCAR rules, regardless of who the individual drivers are, but he was not fined money or points. With less than 25 laps to go in the DieHard 500, Mast was tapped by Buddy Baker entering the tri-oval and flipped over. He slid to a stop a few hundred feet beyond the start-finish line and soon climbed out of the car, much to the delight of the crowd. He was not injured, but half-jokingly said afterwards, "I'm okay but I need another pair of underwear". The next year, Mast won his first career Cup pole at the final race of the 1992 season, the 1992 Hooters 500, which was Richard Petty's final race, Jeff Gordon's first race, and the day that Alan Kulwicki won the championship by one race position over Bill Elliott. Mast's race ended on the first lap in a crash. The team switched to Ford in 1993. Mast had a career year in 1994, with ten Top 10 finishes and a career-high-tying eighteenth, finishing a career-best second at Rockingham Speedway, a race where he slid sideways while racing side-by-side with winner Dale Earnhardt coming out of the final corner. In August of that season, he won the pole position at the inaugural Brickyard 400 at the Indianapolis Motor Speedway (a race for which 90 cars were entered), finishing 18th in points. In comparison, 1995 was disappointing for Mast, with only three Top 10's. Skoal left at the end of the season, and Hooters replaced them, as the team switched to Pontiac. He had three Top 10's late in the year, but when the season came to a close, he and Hooters left PPR.

Late 1990s

Mast signed to drive the No. 75 Remington Arms-sponsored Ford for Butch Mock Motorsports in 1997. Misfortune appeared early as Mast failed to qualify for the Daytona 500, and the season was a struggle. Mast finished 32nd in points that year. 1998 started off better for Mast as he won the pole at the GM Goodwrench Service Plus 400, but his struggles continued, and he left the team when the season came to a close.

After rumors spread that Mast would return to Travis Carter to drive a car sponsored by Kmart, he joined the No. 98 Cale Yarborough-owned team, despite the fact that the team did not have sponsorship. Midway through the season, the team got sponsorship from Universal Studios, and Mast posted two Top 10's and became the first driver since Yarborough to go the whole season without failing to finish a race. However, Universal did not renew their contract, and with questions surrounding Yarborough's plans on continuing to own the team, Mast was out of work again.

Final races
During the early part of 2000, Mast climbed on board to drive the No. 41 Big Daddy's BBQ Sauce-sponsored Chevrolet Monte Carlo for Larry Hedrick Motorsports. But after the Food City 500, Mast departed for A.J. Foyt Racing, and had two Top 10 finishes.

Mast began 2001 with Midwest Transit Racing, but due to sponsorship issues, they only ran part-time, and Mast soon left to drive the No. 27 Sauer-sponsored Pontiac Grand Prix for Eel River Racing, but late in the season, the team closed down, and Mast was out of work once again. He made a deal with Donlavey Racing for the final races of the season.

After Dale Earnhardt's death in the 2001 Daytona 500, Mast was originally tapped by car owner Richard Childress to replace Earnhardt in the legendary RCR car. Mast was called into the shop on the Tuesday after the accident (February 20th). The next day however, on Wednesday, February 21st, before Childress and Mast could make official decisions, Childress would call up, and try to recruit 25 year old Busch Series sensation Kevin Harvick to run full-time in Winston Cup as a back up plan, if Mast did not want to drive the car. While Harvick was competing for the Busch Series Championship that year, the team's original 2001 plan was for him to run a part-time Winston Cup schedule in a third RCR car, which was the #30 AOL-sponsored machine, and have him be ready to compete full-time the following season in 2002. However, Harvick would accept Childress's offer to drive the car full-time, and the rest would be history from here on out. The 2001 season saw Kevin Harvick become the only driver in NASCAR history to win the Busch Series Championship, and win Winston Cup Rookie Of The Year, in the same season. In multiple interviews throughout the years, Harvick has revealed that he initially did not want to drive the legendary car at first, but looking at the bigger picture for RCR as a whole, Harvick said that he had to do what felt right in order to help the RCR company get back on its feet. Had Harvick declined the offer, Mast would have been the full-time driver.

Retirement and legacy
Starting in the 1990's, NASCAR drivers switched to a full-face helmet with a forced-air induction tube.  In May 2002, Mast began feeling ill suddenly. He had lost weight and was forced to miss races to take medical tests to find out what was wrong. It turned out that he had suffered carbon monoxide poisoning and Mast was forced to retire. He officially retired on January 22, 2003 at age 45. After his retirement, he spoke with NASCAR president Mike Helton about having teams redesign their air intake systems to reduce exhaust fumes from entering the fresh-air systems in drivers' helmets.  

When he stopped racing, Mast had an offer from Petty Enterprises to drive the team's No. 45 car for the back half of the 2002 season.

NASCAR increased research into forced-air induction systems as a result of Mast's retirement.  As NASCAR had mandated full-face helmets, teams were using forced-air inlet systems taking air from the car into the driver.  By the Coca-Cola 600 in May 2003, NASCAR approved a carbon monoxide filter to be used into air intake systems.  In 2007, NASCAR phased out leaded racing fuel, with specification fuel supplier Sunoco switching to unleaded racing fuel starting with the second round of the season.  A month later, NASCAR's fifth-generation Cup Series car changed the exhaust exit location to be away from the driver and it cited carbon monoxide poisoning cases like Mast's as a reason for the change.

After retirement from racing
As of 2007, he currently resides in his hometown of Rockbridge Baths, Virginia. He owns and operates RKM EnviroClean, Inc.  which specializes in environmental clean-up services, underground utilities contracting, and site demolition. Additionally, Mast also remains actively involved with his charitable organization, the Rick Mast Foundation.

In 2018, Rick and his son Ricky started a podcast entitled Mast Cast where the two discuss Rick's driving days and current events in NASCAR.

Movie credits
In the movie Days of Thunder, Mast drove as a stunt double in Rowdy Burns' car for scenes shot at the Daytona International Speedway. The footage was shot during qualifying and during the Duel qualifying races.

Personal life
Mast and his wife Sharon have three children: Ricky, Kaitie, and Sarah. He did some announcing after he retired from racing, but decided that he wanted to stay home to help raise his twin daughters after missing out on most too much of Ricky's upbringing. Ricky is the Digital Content Manager for Major League Baseball's Atlanta Braves. Sarah and Kaitie attend the University of Virginia, and James Madison University, respectively.

Motorsports career results

NASCAR
(key) (Bold – Pole position awarded by qualifying time. Italics – Pole position earned by points standings or practice time. * – Most laps led.)

Winston Cup Series

Daytona 500

Busch Series

ARCA Talladega SuperCar Series
(key) (Bold – Pole position awarded by qualifying time. Italics – Pole position earned by points standings or practice time. * – Most laps led.)

References

External links

1957 births
Living people
NASCAR drivers
People from Rockbridge County, Virginia
Racing drivers from Virginia
ARCA Menards Series drivers
A. J. Foyt Enterprises drivers
Richard Childress Racing drivers